Veglio is a comune (municipality) in the Province of Biella in the Italian region Piedmont, located about  northeast of Turin and about  northeast of Biella.

Veglio borders the following municipalities: Bioglio, Camandona, Mosso, Pettinengo, Piatto, Quittengo, Sagliano Micca, Tavigliano, Valle Mosso.

Demographic evolution

References

Cities and towns in Piedmont